In Norse mythology, a fylgja (Old Norse: , plural  ) is a supernatural being or spirit which accompanies a person in connection to their fate or fortune.

Description
The word   means "to accompany" similar to that of the  Fetch in Irish folklore. It can also mean "afterbirth of a child" meaning that the afterbirth and the fylgja are connected. In some instances, the fylgja can take on the form of the animal that shows itself when a baby is born or as the creature that eats the afterbirth. In some literature and sagas, the fylgjur can take the form of mice, dogs, foxes, cats, birds of prey, or carrion eaters because these were animals that would typically eat such afterbirths. 

Other ideas of fylgjur are that the animals reflect the character of the person they represent, akin to a totem animal. Men who were viewed as a leader would often have fylgja to show their true character. This means that if they had a "tame nature", their fylgja would typically be an ox, goat, or boar. If they had an "untame nature" they would have fylgjur such as a fox, wolf, deer, bear, eagle, falcon, leopard, lion, or a serpent. 

The animal fylgja is said to appear in front of its owner, often in dreams, and offer portents of events to come. As such it is a representation of the future itself, not the character of a person. Like a person's fate the fylgja is not changeable, nor can it improve or act on its own. 

Fylgjur may also "mark transformations between human and animal" or shape shifting. In Egil's Saga, there are references to both Egil and Skallagrim transforming into wolves or bears, and there are examples of shape shifting in the Saga of King Hrolf Kraki, where Bodvar Bjarki turns into a bear during a battle as a last stand. These transformations are possibly implied in the saga descriptions of berserkers who transform into animals or display bestial abilities.

Fylgjur usually appear in the form of an animal or a human and commonly appear during sleep, but the sagas relate that they could appear while a person is awake as well, and that seeing one's fylgja is an omen of one's impending death. However, when fylgjur appear in the form of women, they are then supposedly guardian spirits for people or clans (ættir). According to Else Mundal, the women fylgja could also be considered a dís, a ghost or goddess that is attached to fate. 

Gabriel Turville-Petre cites multiple instances where an evil wizard or sorcerer's fylgja is a fox, because the image is sly and hiding something, or an enemy's fylgja is a wolf.  In The Story of Howard the Halt , the character Atli has a dream about eighteen wolves running towards him with a vixen as their leader.  As it turns out, the dream presages that Atli will be attacked by an army with a sorcerer at the front.

Both Andy Orchard and Rudolf Simek note parallels between the concept of the  female guardian  hamingja—a personification of a family's or individual's fortune—and the fylgja. An example of such an occurrence would be in Gisli Surrson's Saga where the main character, Gisli, is visited by two beautiful women, one who is trying to bring good fortune and one that is trying to edge him towards violence. These two women could represent the women ancestors of Gisli's family ties, such as the ties between his wife Aud and his sister Thordis, relating to the idea of the Hamingja and Dís.

See also
Anima and animus
Augoeides
Daemon
Dís
Familiar spirit
Fetch (folklore)
Luonto
Norns
Totem
Valkyrie
Vörðr

References

Sources
Kellog, Robert (Introduction); Smiley, Jane (Introduction)  (2001)  The Sagas of Icelanders  (Penguin Group)  
Orchard, Andy (1997)  Dictionary of Norse Myth and Legend  (Cassell) 
Simek, Rudolf  translated by Angela Hall (2007) Dictionary of Northern Mythology. (D.S. Brewer) 
Pulsiano, Phillip (1993)  Supernatural Beings in Medieval Scandinavia: An Encyclopedia  (Taylor & Francis)    
Mundal, Else; translated by Hedin Brønner (1974) Fylgjemotiva i norrfin litteratur  (Universitetsforlaget, Oslo)

Further reading
Turville-Petre, G. (1958)  Dreams in Icelandic Traditions  (Folklore Enterprises; pp. 93–11)
Andrén, Anders; Jennbert, Kristina; Raudvere, Catharina (2006) Old Norse religion in long-term perspectives (Chicago: Nordic Academic Press; pp. 137–138) 
The Story of Howard the Halt   (Icelandic Saga Database)  
Jochens, Jenny   (1996) Old Norse Images of Women (Philadelphia: University of Pennsylvania)
Connor Finn; The Secret of Snow. (Fictional novel involving fylgja)
William Friesen, 'Fylgjur in Icelandic Saga', Scandinavian Studies, 87 (2015), 255-80, .
Zuzana Stankovitsová, 'Following up on Female fylgjur: A Re-examination of the Concept of Female fylgjur in Old Icelandic Literature', in Paranormal Encounters in Iceland 1150-1400, ed. by Miriam Mayburd and Ármann Jakobsson (Berlin: De Gruyter, 2020), pp. 245-62  (cf. Zuzana Stankovitsová, '“Eru þetta mannafylgjur”: A Re-Examination of fylgjurin Old Norse Literature' (unpublished MA thesis, University of Iceland, 2015)).

Creatures in Norse mythology
Scandinavian legendary creatures
Magical terms in Germanic mysticism
Norwegian folklore  
Swedish folklore 
Danish folklore
Deities and spirits
Destiny
Luck